Staurodiscus is a genus of hydrozoans belonging to the family Hebellidae.

The species of this genus are found in Atlantic, Pacific and Indian Ocean.

Species

Species:

Staurodiscus arcuatus 
Staurodiscus brooksii 
Staurodiscus cirrus

References

Hebellidae
Hydrozoan genera